This article presents the discography of American country music singer-songwriter Larry Gatlin.

Studio albums

Larry Gatlin and the Gatlin Brothers

1970s–1980s

1990s–2000s

Compilation albums

Christmas albums

Live albums

Larry Gatlin and the Gatlin Brothers

Singles

Larry Gatlin and the Gatlin Brothers

1970s–1990s

2000s–2010s

Notes
A^ Larry Gatlin with Family and Friends was released as Broken Lady in the United Kingdom.

Music videos

References

Gatlin, Larry
Discographies of American artists